Otterøy is a former municipality in the old Nord-Trøndelag county, Norway. The  municipality existed from 1913 until its dissolution in 1964. It was located in the what is now the municipality of Namsos in Trøndelag county. The former municipality included most of the island of Otterøya (the part south of Tømmervikfjellet mountain), the island of Hoddøya, the southwestern part of the island of Elvalandet, and some of the mainland southwest of Otterøya and Hoddøya. The area contains good farmland and also good salmon fishing. The main church for the area is Otterøy Church.

History
The municipality of Otterøy was established on 1 January 1913 when it was split off from the municipality of Fosnes. Initially, Otterøy had a population of 1,631. During the 1960s, there were many municipal mergers across Norway due to the work of the Schei Committee. On 1 January 1964, the municipality of Otterøy was dissolved and split between two neighboring municipalities, dividing roughly along the Namsenfjorden. All of Otterøy that was located on the mainland south of the Namsenfjord (population: 571) was merged into the municipality of Namdalseid. All of Otterøy that was on the island of Otterøya and the island of Hoddøya (population: 1,013) became a part of the municipality of Namsos.

Name
The municipality is named after the island of Otterøya since the island made up a large portion of the municipality.

Government
While it existed, this municipality was responsible for primary education (through 10th grade), outpatient health services, senior citizen services, unemployment, social services, zoning, economic development, and municipal roads. During its existence, this municipality was governed by a municipal council of elected representatives, which in turn elected a mayor.

Municipal council
The municipal council  of Otterøy was made up of representatives that were elected to four year terms. The party breakdown of the final municipal council was as follows:

Mayors
The mayors of Otterøy:

 1913–1916: Peter Øien
 1917–1919: Ole Hovik 	Gårdbruker (V)
 1920–1934: Jørgen Ludvig Ekker (Bp)
 1935–1942: Jørgen Johannessen Ekker (V)
 1942–1943: Sigurd Kvalstad (NS)
 1943–1944: Vilhelm Øien (NS)
 1944–1945: Bjarne Skavdal (NS)
 1945-1945: Jørgen Johannessen Ekker (V)
 1946–1947: Olav Bruknapp (KrF)
 1948–1951: Otto Ekker (Bp)
 1952–1955: Sverre Sørvig (H)
 1956–1959: Erling Skorstad (Bp)
 1960–1963: Job Hodø (Sp)

See also
List of former municipalities of Norway

References

Namsos
Former municipalities of Norway
1913 establishments in Norway
1964 disestablishments in Norway